For the American activist and former Hadassah leader, see June Walker (Hadassah)

June Walker (June 14, 1900 – February 3, 1966) was an American stage and film actress.

Early years
Walker was born in New York City on June 14, 1900, and was orphaned when she was 14. She worked as a millinery clerk before becoming an actress.

Stage career

Walker performed as a member of the chorus of a Globe Theater production of Hitchy-Koo when she was 16 years old.

She appeared on Broadway in such plays as Green Grow the Lilacs, The Farmer Takes a Wife, and Twelfth Night. She was the first actress to portray the character of Lorelei Lee, in the 1926 Broadway production of Gentlemen Prefer Blondes. Her obituary in The New York Times said the role "was as much her creation as that of Anita Loos who wrote the book that became the comedy ..." The success of the play launched Walker's career, and she had further Broadway successes. She played Linda Loman to Thomas Mitchell's Willy in the 1949 touring company of Death of a Salesman. She toured as Vinnie in Life with Father

Film career
Walker acted in silent films for Essanay Studios and in sound films, including A Child Is Waiting, Through Different Eyes, The Unforgiven, and War Nurse.

Personal life
In 1926, she married British actor Geoffrey Kerr. The couple divorced in 1943; their son was actor John Kerr. She appeared with her son in a 1954 episode of NBC's Justice. It was his first acting engagement.

Death
On  February 3, 1966, aged 65, Walker died of undisclosed causes at her son's home in Los Angeles. She was interred in the Westwood Village Memorial Park Cemetery in Los Angeles.

Filmography

References

External links

1900 births
1966 deaths
American stage actresses
American film actresses
American television actresses
Actresses from Chicago
Burials at Westwood Village Memorial Park Cemetery
20th-century American actresses
20th-century American singers